is a Japanese ski jumper who has been competing since 2004. At the FIS Nordic World Ski Championships, he won two bronze medals in the team large hill (2007, 2009).

As of 2007, his best World Cup finish is 6th at Kuusamo in 2009. Tochimoto's best individual finish was third at an FIS Cup competition at Sapporo in 2006.

At the 2010 Winter Olympics in Vancouver, he finished fifth in the team large hill, 37th in the individual normal hill, and 45th in the individual large hill events.

References

1989 births
Japanese male ski jumpers
Living people
Olympic ski jumpers of Japan
Sportspeople from Sapporo
Ski jumpers at the 2010 Winter Olympics
FIS Nordic World Ski Championships medalists in ski jumping